Erich Kuhn (31 July 1890 – 12 February 1967) was a German sculptor. His work was part of the sculpture event in the art competition at the 1936 Summer Olympics.

References

1890 births
1967 deaths
20th-century German sculptors
20th-century German male artists
German male sculptors
Olympic competitors in art competitions
People from Berlin